Pleasant Camp is a government facility in the remote Atlin District of northwestern British Columbia, Canada at an elevation of . It is the western-most community in British Columbia (see Extreme communities of Canada). It is a federal government camp servicing the Port of Pleasant Camp and offers no public amenities.

The Port of Pleasant Camp is on the Haines Highway/Yukon #3 Highway and is a border crossing between the US and Canada.

Pleasant Camp has one of the highest snowfall totals in Canada. 

The population in fall of 2021 was counted as 11 people, the youngest being 3 months old. The population fluctuates between 4 and 16.

Local wildlife varies with many visits from black bear, porcupine, fox, eagles and moose.

Climate
Pleasant Camp has a dry-summer subarctic climate (Köppen climate classification: Dsc), though it is extremely atypical of the type in its pronounced summer precipitation minimum, very heavy autumn rainfall, and extreme winter snowfall.

Extreme minima are much milder than in interior British Columbia: temperatures have never reached  whereas Prince George and Fort St. John though further south have reached  during extreme cold periods.

References

Settlements in British Columbia
Atlin District